Alice Stoffel (30 October 1905 – 22 August 1983) was a French backstroke and breaststroke swimmer. She competed at the 1924 Summer Olympics and the 1928 Summer Olympics.

References

External links
 

1905 births
1983 deaths
French female backstroke swimmers
French female breaststroke swimmers
Olympic swimmers of France
Swimmers at the 1924 Summer Olympics
Swimmers at the 1928 Summer Olympics
Sportspeople from Colmar
20th-century French women